Ove Røsbak (born 5 August 1959) is a Norwegian poet, novelist, children's writer and biographer.

He made his literary debut in 1977 with the poetry collection Lævandes dikt. He has written biographies on Alf Prøysen and Rolf Jacobsen.

He received the Cappelen Prize in 1984.

References

1959 births
Living people
20th-century Norwegian poets
Norwegian male poets
20th-century Norwegian novelists
21st-century Norwegian novelists
Norwegian children's writers
Norwegian biographers
People from Furnes, Norway

Male biographers
Norwegian male novelists
20th-century Norwegian male writers
21st-century Norwegian male writers